Seung Hyo-bin is a South Korean actress and model. She is known for roles in dramas such as Heading to the Ground, Face Me and Smile and My Shining Girl. She is also did roles in movies such as Good Morning President and Heartbeat.

Biography and career
She was born on December 5, 1983 in Seoul. She completed her studies from New York Film Academy, she studied acting. She made her debut as an actress in 1999. After her debut as an actress, she has appeared in several films and television dramas including, Heading to the Ground, My Shining Girl and Face Me and Smile. She also appeared in 2NE1's music video I Don`t Care.

Filmography

Television series

Film

Awards and nominations
 2006 Miss Korea New York Beauty Award

References

External links
 

1983 births
Living people
21st-century South Korean actresses
South Korean female models
South Korean television actresses
South Korean film actresses
People from Seoul